The Afro-Eurasian Eclipse (subtitled A Suite in Eight Parts) is a studio album by American pianist, composer and bandleader Duke Ellington recorded in 1971 and released on the Fantasy label in 1975. Like other world music-influenced suites composed in the last decade of his life, The Afro-Eurasian Eclipse was called by NPR music critic David Brent Johnson one of Ellington's "late-period masterpieces."

The album opens with a short spoken word introduction in which Ellington explains that the suite's title is inspired by Marshall McLuhan's vision of the onset of global cultural identity.

Reception
Allmusic has awarded the album 4 stars, describing it as "compelling, cosmopolitan, and organic ... All in all, a textured, cross-cultural treat for the ears."

Track listing
All compositions by Duke Ellington
 "Chinoiserie" - 8:13  
 "Didjeridoo" - 3:37  
 "Afrique" - 5:23  
 "Acht O'Clock Rock" - 3:04  
 "Gong" - 4:42  
 "Tang" - 4:45  
 "True" - 3:35  
 "Hard Way" - 4:09  

Notes:
 Recorded at National Recording Studio in New York, NY on February 17, 1971.
 Track 1 opens with a short spoken word introduction; "Chinoiserie" begins at 1:36.
 Ellington's "Afrique" is not to be confused with the Lee Morgan composition of the same name.

Legacy
The 2001 Duke Ellington tribute album Red Hot + Indigo includes two compositions from The Afro-Eurasian Eclipse: "Didjeridoo" is performed by the jazz-influenced post-rock band Tortoise, and "Acht O'Clock Rock" is performed by jazz-fusion trio Medeski Martin & Wood, who also covered "Chinoiserie" on their 1995 album Friday Afternoon in the Universe, and have often performed these and other Ellington compositions live.

Personnel
Duke Ellington – piano
Mercer Ellington, Money Johnson, Eddie Preston, Cootie Williams – trumpet
Malcolm Taylor, Booty Wood - trombone
Chuck Connors – bass trombone 
Russell Procope – alto saxophone, clarinet
Norris Turney – clarinet, alto saxophone, flute
Harold Ashby, Paul Gonsalves – tenor saxophone
Harry Carney – baritone saxophone 
Joe Benjamin – bass
Rufus Jones – drums
Technical
Roger Rhodes - recording engineer
Jim Stern - remix engineer
Phil Carroll - art direction

References

Fantasy Records albums
Duke Ellington albums
1971 albums